The Marque is a  long river in France. It is a right tributary of the Deûle. Its source is near the village of Mons-en-Pévèle. Its course crosses the Nord department, notably the eastern part of the agglomeration of Lille. It flows northwards through the towns of Pont-à-Marcq, Tressin, Villeneuve d'Ascq, Croix and Marcq-en-Barœul, finally flowing into the Deûle in Marquette-lez-Lille. Its lowermost section, between Wasquehal and Marquette-lez-Lille, is part of the Canal de Roubaix.

References

Rivers of France
Villeneuve-d'Ascq
Rivers of Nord (French department)
Rivers of Hauts-de-France